The National Industrial Security Program, or NISP, is the nominal authority in the United States for managing the needs of private industry to access classified information.

The NISP was established in 1993 by Executive Order 12829.  The National Security Council nominally sets policy for the NISP, while the Director of the Information Security Oversight Office is nominally the authority for implementation.  Under the ISOO, the Secretary of Defense is nominally the Executive Agent, but the NISP recognizes four different Cognizant Security Agencies, all of which have equal authority: the Department of Defense, the Department of Energy, the Central Intelligence Agency, and the Nuclear Regulatory Commission.

Defense Counterintelligence and Security Agency administers the NISP on behalf of the Department of Defense and 34 other federal agencies.

NISP Operating Manual (DoD 5220.22-M) 
A major component of the NISP is the NISP Operating Manual, also called NISPOM, or DoD  5220.22-M. The NISPOM establishes the standard procedures and requirements for all government contractors, with regards to classified information. , the current NISPOM edition is dated 28 Feb 2006.  Chapters and selected sections of this edition are:

 Chapter 1 – General Provisions and Requirements
 Chapter 2 – Security Clearances
 Section 1 – Facility Clearances
 Section 2 – Personnel Security Clearances
 Section 3 – Foreign Ownership, Control, or Influence (FOCI)
 Chapter 3 – Security Training and Briefings
 Chapter 4 – Classification and Marking
 Chapter 5 – Safeguarding Classified Information
 Chapter 6 – Visits and Meetings
 Chapter 7 – Subcontracting
 Chapter 8 – Information System Security
 Chapter 9 – Special Requirements
 Section 1 – RD and FRD
 Section 2 – DoD Critical Nuclear Weapon Design Information (CNWDI)
 Section 3 – Intelligence Information
 Section 4 – Communication Security (COMSEC)
 Chapter 10 – International Security Requirements
 Chapter 11 – Miscellaneous Information
 Section 1 – TEMPEST
 Section 2 – Defense Technical Information Center (DTIC)
 Section 3 – Independent Research and Development (IR&D) Efforts
 Appendices

Data sanitization
DoD 5220.22-M is sometimes cited as a standard for sanitization to counter data remanence.  The NISPOM actually covers the entire field of government–industrial security, of which data sanitization is a very small part (about two paragraphs in a 141-page document). Furthermore, the NISPOM does not actually specify any particular method.  Standards for sanitization are left up to the Cognizant Security Authority.  The Defense Security Service provides a Clearing and Sanitization Matrix (C&SM) which does specify methods.  As of the June 2007 edition of the DSS C&SM, overwriting is no longer acceptable for sanitization of magnetic media; only degaussing or physical destruction is acceptable.

References

External links
 EO-12829 overview ("National Industrial Security Program")
 EO-12829 PDF
 NIST News Archive 2014-12-18

Establishments by United States executive order
United States intelligence agencies
United States Department of Defense agencies
Classified documents
Data security
United States government secrecy
Data erasure